Neil Stanley "Stan" Alves, OAM (born 22 May 1946) is a former Australian rules football player and coach.

Playing career

Melbourne
Alves played 226 games and kicked a total of 160 goals for the Melbourne Football Club from 1965 until 1976. captaining them from 1973–1976 and finishing runner-up for the Brownlow Medal in 1975.

North Melbourne
Alves joined North Melbourne in 1977.  Legend has it that he chose to play for North Melbourne rather than Collingwood based on a coin toss.  It proved to be a wise decision as North Melbourne met Collingwood in the 1977 Grand Final and, after initially playing a 76-all draw, won the replay 151–124. 

Alves played 40 games for North Melbourne and kicked a total of 14 goals from 1977 until 1979 before retiring from his playing career.

Coaching career

St Kilda Football Club senior coach (1994-1998)

Alves became senior coach of St Kilda in 1994, when he replaced Ken Sheldon. In the 1994 season, St Kilda under Alves finished 13th on the ladder out of 15 teams in a disappointing season. The following  1995 season, St Kilda once again under Alves had another disappointing season as they finished 14th out of 16 teams.  St Kilda won the 1996 pre-season competition. In the 1996 season, St Kilda under Alves had another disappointing season, after a promising pre-season competition to find itself finished 10th after round 22. St Kilda won just 10 games for the season.

Alves however went on to coach St Kilda in the 1997 season to finish as runners up and first grand final in 26 years in 1997, where St Kilda under Alves lost to Adelaide by thirty-one points in the 1997 AFL Grand Final.  This earned Alves the AFL Coach of the Year award. In the 1998 season, St Kilda under Alves had a great start winning 11 of its first 14 games, but unfortunately an end of season drop of form saw St Kilda drop down the ladder. St Kilda again qualified for the Finals Series finishing sixth. In the 1998 Finals Series, St Kilda were eliminated by Melbourne In the semi final. At the end of the 1998 season, Alves was sacked as St Kilda Football Club senior coach. Alves was then replaced by Tim Watson as St Kilda Football Club senior coach.

Awards 
On 24 October 2000, Alves was awarded the Australian Sports Medal for his contribution to Australian football. On 26 January 2008, Alves was awarded the Order of Australia Medal for "service to Australian Rules football as a player, coach and commentator, and to the community as a supporter of charitable organisations".

Statistics

Playing statistics

|- style="background-color: #EAEAEA"
! scope="row" style="text-align:center" | 1965
|style="text-align:center;"|
| 15 || 12 || 1 || 2 || 115 || 13 || 128 || 32 ||  || 0.1 || 0.2 || 9.6 || 1.1 || 10.7 || 2.7 || 
|-
! scope="row" style="text-align:center" | 1966
|style="text-align:center;"|
| 15 || 18 || 2 || 12 || 254 || 44 || 298 || 63 ||  || 0.1 || 0.7 || 14.1 || 2.4 || 16.6 || 3.5 || 
|- style="background:#eaeaea;"
! scope="row" style="text-align:center" | 1967
|style="text-align:center;"|
| 15 || 18 || 7 || 5 || 296 || 48 || 344 || 83 ||  || 0.4 || 0.3 || 16.4 || 2.7 || 19.1 || 4.6 || 
|-
! scope="row" style="text-align:center" | 1968
|style="text-align:center;"|
| 15 || 18 || 20 || 17 || 278 || 70 || 348 || 74 ||  || 1.1 || 0.9 || 15.4 || 3.9 || 19.3 || 4.1 || 
|- style="background:#eaeaea;"
! scope="row" style="text-align:center" | 1969
|style="text-align:center;"|Melbourne
| 15 || 20 || 16 || 20 || 317 || 72 || 389 || 89 ||  || 0.8 || 1.0 || 15.9 || 3.6 || 19.5 || 4.5 || 
|-
! scope="row" style="text-align:center" | 1970
|style="text-align:center;"|
| 15 || 20 || 3 || 16 || 318 || 84 || 402 || 98 ||  || 0.2 || 0.8 || 15.9 || 4.2 || 20.1 || 4.9 || 
|- style="background:#eaeaea;"
! scope="row" style="text-align:center" | 1971
|style="text-align:center;"|
| 15 || 18 || 9 || 17 || 276 || 81 || 357 || 92 ||  || 0.5 || 0.9 || 15.3 || 4.5 || 19.8 || 5.1 || 
|-
! scope="row" style="text-align:center" | 1972
|style="text-align:center;"|
| 15 || 21 || 22 || 14 || 373 || 62 || 435 || 136 ||  || 1.0 || 0.7 || 17.8 || 3.0 || 20.7 || 6.5 || 
|- style="background:#eaeaea;"
! scope="row" style="text-align:center" | 1973
|style="text-align:center;"|
| 15 || 22 || 29 || 27 || 318 || 83 || 401 || 120 ||  || 1.3 || 1.2 || 14.5 || 3.8 || 18.2 || 5.5 || 
|-
! scope="row" style="text-align:center" | 1974
|style="text-align:center;"|
| 15 || 21 || 11 || 24 || 343 || 114 || 457 || 123 ||  || 0.5 || 1.1 || 16.3 || 5.4 || 21.8 || 5.9 || 
|- style="background:#eaeaea;"
! scope="row" style="text-align:center" | 1975
|style="text-align:center;"|
| 15 || 20 || 26 || 19 || 320 || 97 || 417 || 105 ||  || 1.3 || 1.1 || 16.8 || 5.1 || 22.0 || 5.5 || 
|-
! scope="row" style="text-align:center" | 1976
|style="text-align:center;"|
| 15 || 18 || 14 || 19 || 225 || 120 || 345 || 73 ||  || 0.8 || 1.1 || 12.5 || 6.7 || 19.2 || 4.1 || 
|- style="background:#eaeaea;"
! scope="row" style="text-align:center;" | 1977
|style="text-align:center;"|
| 2 || 16 || 3 || 11 || 223 || 81 || 304 || 84 ||  || 0.2 || 0.7 || 13.9 || 5.1 || 19.0 || 5.3 || 
|-
! scope="row" style="text-align:center" | 1978
|style="text-align:center;"|
| 2 || 6 || 2 || 3 || 74 || 22 || 96 || 27 ||  || 0.3 || 0.5 || 12.3 || 3.7 || 16.0 || 4.5 || 
|- style="background:#eaeaea;"
! scope="row" style="text-align:center" | 1979
|style="text-align:center;"|
| 2 || 18 || 9 || 14 || 210 || 84 || 294 || 66 ||  || 0.5 || 0.8 || 11.7 || 4.7 || 16.3 || 3.7 || 
|- class="sortbottom"
! colspan=3| Career
! 266
! 174
! 220
! 3940
! 1075
! 5015
! 1265
! 
! 0.7
! 0.8
! 14.9
! 4.1
! 18.9
! 4.8
! 
|}

Coaching statistics

|- style="background-color: #EAEAEA"
! scope="row" style="text-align:center; font-weight:normal" | 1994
|style="text-align:center;"|
| 22 || 7 || 14 || 1 || 34.1% || 13 || 15
|-
! scope="row" style="text-align:center; font-weight:normal" | 1995
|style="text-align:center;"|
| 22 || 8 || 14 || 0 || 36.4% || 14 || 16
|- style="background-color: #EAEAEA"
! scope="row" style="text-align:center; font-weight:normal" | 1996
|style="text-align:center;"|
| 22 || 10 || 12 || 0 || 45.5% || 10 || 16
|-
! scope="row" style="text-align:center; font-weight:normal" | 1997
|style="text-align:center;"|
| 25 || 17 || 8 || 0 || 68.0% || 1 || 16
|- style="background-color: #EAEAEA"
! scope="row" style="text-align:center; font-weight:normal" | 1998
|style="text-align:center;"|
| 24 || 13 || 11 || 0 || 54.2% || 6 || 16
|- class="sortbottom"
! colspan=2| Career totals
! 115
! 55
! 59
! 1
! 48.3%
! colspan=2|
|}

References

External links 

 Stan Alves' website
 DemonWiki profile

1946 births
Living people
Australian rules footballers from Melbourne
Melbourne Football Club players
Melbourne Football Club captains
North Melbourne Football Club players
North Melbourne Football Club Premiership players
St Kilda Football Club coaches
All-Australian coaches
Keith 'Bluey' Truscott Trophy winners
Recipients of the Medal of the Order of Australia
Recipients of the Australian Sports Medal
One-time VFL/AFL Premiership players